Urolosia opalocincta is a moth in the subfamily Arctiinae. It was described by Herbert Druce in 1898. It is found in French Guiana.

References

External links
Original description: Annals and Magazine of Natural History: 404.

Moths described in 1898
Arctiinae